Talesavara Siva Temple – II is a Hindu temple located in Bhubaneswar, Orissa, India.  Talesvara Siva temple is located in the Bharati Matha precinct in Badhaibanka chowk, Old town, Bhubaneswar. The shrine includes a Siva lingam and a circular shrine. The upper part of the temple was renovated by Matha authorities with the financial support of a devotee.

It is owned by Bharti Matha. Pranava Kishore Bharati Goswami is the Matha Mahanta.

Physical description
 This temple is situated within the precinct of Bharati matha. It is surrounded by the burials of the Matha Mahantas in the east and Matha entrance in the north.
 The temple faces west.
 The building is made up off Coarse grained sandstone and shows dry masonry technique.
 The anuratha paga of the temple is decorated with a series of ghata-pallava.
 The temple is partially buried up to the pabhaga portion.

Condition
 The western side is partly damaged.
 The carvings in the temple walls are largely eroded.
 A super cyclone caused severe damage, which was repaired by Bharati Matha

References 
 Debala Mitra, ‘Bhubaneswar’ New Delhi, 1958, P. 29.
 K.C. Panigrahi, Archaeological Remains at Bhubaneswar, Calcutta, 1961. PP. 16–17.
 L. S.S. O’ Malley, Bengal District Gazetteer Puri, Calcutta 1908, P. 240.
 M.M. Ganguly, Orissa and Her remains, Calcutta, 1912, PP. 393–394.
 P.R. Ramachandra Rao, Bhubaneswar Kalinga Temple Architecture, Hyderabad, 1980, P. 29.
 R.P. Mohapatra, ‘Archaeology in Orissa’. Vol. I, Delhi, 1986. P. 57.
 R.L. Mitra. The Antiauities of Orissa, Vol.II, Calcutta, 1963, PP. 160–161.
 T.E. Donaldson, ‘Hindu Temple Art of Orissa’. Vol. I, Leiden, 1985, P. 76.

Hindu temples in Bhubaneswar